Spirituality Shopper was a short lived British television series that ran on Channel 4 for 3 episodes in 2005. It was presented by Christian athlete, Jonathan Edwards. In each episode, a person looked at four different religious practices that could be implemented in their (non-religious) lives to see if it would bring them inner peace in the hustle and bustle of the 21st century. In each episode, four of the practices were looked at:
 Episode 1 - Michaela, who looks at Sufi Whirling (as taught by Sheikh Ahmad Dede), Buddhist Meditation, Christian Lent and Jewish Shabbat.
 Episode 2 - Karen, who looks at Christian Gospel singing, Sikh langars, Hindu yoga, and Christian Meditation.
 Episode 3 - Charlie, who looks at Taoist Tai Chi, Pagan drumming, Quaker contemplation and Islamic prayer.

External links
 ekklesia article
 Guardian review
 'your friend' review

Channel 4 original programming
2005 British television series debuts
2005 British television series endings